Nuria Llagostera Vives was the defending champion, but lost in the second round to Patricia Mayr.

Seeds

Draw

Finals

Top half

Bottom half

References

External links
Draw

Copa Sony Ericsson Colsanitas - Singles
Copa Colsanitas